V. Neil Caldwell (November 13, 1929 – February 6, 2018) was an American politician. He served as a Democratic member in the Texas House of Representatives from 1960 to 1977. From 1987-1988, he was the State Artist of Texas. Caldwell also served as a judge on the 23rd Judicial District of Texas.

References

1929 births
2018 deaths
Members of the Texas House of Representatives